KSBU (92.7 FM, "92.7 The Touch") is a radio station licensed to serve the community of Delta, Louisiana. The station is owned by Holladay Broadcasting of Louisiana, LLC, and airs an urban adult contemporary format.

The station was assigned the KSBU call letters by the Federal Communications Commission on August 26, 2010.

References

External links
 Official Website
 FCC Public Inspection File for KSBU
 

Radio stations in Louisiana
Radio stations established in 2013
2013 establishments in Louisiana
Urban adult contemporary radio stations in the United States
Madison Parish, Louisiana